Thomas Waryn (some sources Waryng) was Archdeacon of Armagh from 1448 from his death in 1477.

Notes

Archdeacons of Armagh
15th-century Irish Roman Catholic priests